The Kryvyi Rih Metrotram or the Kryvyi Rih Metro is a partially underground rapid transit light rail system that serves the city of Kryvyi Rih, the seventh-largest city in Ukraine.

Despite its designation as a "metro tram" and its use of tram cars as rolling stock, the Kryvyi Rih Metrotram is fully grade-separated both from roads and from the city's conventional tram lines, with enclosed stations and tracks.

History
The design of the Metrotram seen in Kryvyi Rih has its roots in the socialist urban planning guidelines that were formulated in the 1960s, based on models of the emergence of new urban centers and the transport arrangements that would suit them, in particular, how a small settlement would grow into a full-sized city, and at which point a rapid transit system would need to be built. Kryvyi Rih and Volgograd were both chosen to test whether the construction of a full-scale metro system could be avoided by adopting a light rail design for a socialist city. Both cities had developed tram networks, but like most urban centers, overcrowding and widespread congestion proved too much for the trams to serve as the main transport arteries. Moreover, both cities were destroyed in World War II and rebuilt, with all the requirements of a modern city considered in planning.

In both cases, the Metrotram was intended to serve only an interim, albeit necessary, role, with provision for conversion into a full metro system. Construction in both cities began simultaneously in the mid-1970s. In Volgograd, this involved separating off an existing tram route with an underground section in the city center. In Kryvyi Rih, however, the Metrotram route was built from scratch, albeit in a similar manner, with most of the section running along the surface, except in the very center of the city. All of the underground dimensions were made with provision for eventual conversion into a full metro system.

As the Kryvyi Rih Metrotram was built from scratch, even stops in the surface sections are referred to as stations (as opposed to stops) and all are separate complexes. Each station is an architectural monument for its neighborhood, in the style of late Soviet architecture.

Between 1988 and 1989, a second segment was opened in the southern direction with three additional stations, and after 1991, the line was extended northward, reaching in the year 2001  and 11 stations.

In 2012, the southern end of the line was connected with the city's conventional tram system and an additional route was created extending to the nearby metallurgical combine.

On 1 May 2021 Kryvyi Rih became the first city in Ukraine to introduce free travel in public transport for its citizens. In order not to pay for municipal transport one must show a special electronic "Kryvyi Riher's Card".

In Spring 2022 using city public transport became free for all passengers.

Timeline

Facts and figures

The system is operated by the city municipal company and has a total length of 18.7 km, 7 km of which (40%) are fully underground. The entire system has 11 stations: 4 of them are located underground, 2 stations have only underground vestibules and also 2 stations are above the ground, all built up to metro standard. In addition, there is one station, Vovnopriadilna, that was built but is currently not opened due to the absence of passenger traffic in the area. There are four routes: Kiltseva - Maidan Pratsi, Kiltseva - Zarichna, Zarichna - PGZK Circle and Zarichna - KMK Circle, with a branch at Sonyachna for the first two routes.

The rolling stock used on the system consists of the Tatra and the KTM. Two depots serve the system: one is located near Maidan Pratsi station; the other one is situated at Tram Park in the southeastern part of the Central City District. For more convenient tram turnarounds, there are turning circles at both ends of the lines.

Prospects for growth
When the Soviet Union collapsed, the development of rapid transit systems in all of the former republics was deprived of funding and neglected. In many cases, cities that acquired a metro system in the late 1980s only gained an initial stretch with passenger flows barely making the systems significant. In both Metrotram cities, however, the reverse was the case.

The KRMT carries 40 million people annually, with a record of 56 million in 1997. In comparison, annual passenger numbers on the Dnipro Metro, which opened in 1995, amount to slightly less than 7.5 million. The light rail's compatibility and low construction costs have shown it to be superior to the "hard rail" in every respect, and, unlike the metros in Dnipro and many other post-Soviet cities, KR Metro now functions as an important traffic artery.

Network Map

See also
Buffalo Metro Rail
Porto Metro
Málaga Metro
West Midlands Metro
Tyne and Wear Metro
Charleroi Metro

References

External links

 Kryvyi Rih Metro Track Map

 
Transport in Kryvyi Rih
Light rail in Ukraine
Rapid transit in Ukraine
Underground rapid transit in Ukraine